The 1993–94 Penn Quakers men's basketball team represented the University of Pennsylvania during the 1993–94 NCAA Division I men's basketball season. The Quakers, led by 5th-year head coach Fran Dunphy, played their home games at The Palestra as members of the Ivy League. They finished the season 25–3, 14–0 in Ivy League play to win the conference championship. They received the Ivy League's automatic bid to the NCAA tournament where they defeated No. 6 seed Nebraska in the opening round before losing to No. 3 seed and eventual Final Four participant Florida in the second round.

This was the second of three consecutive 14–0 seasons, and one of five overall in the Dunphy era, in Ivy League play.

Roster

Schedule and results

|-
!colspan=9 style=| Non-conference regular season

|-
!colspan=9 style=| Ivy League regular season

|-
!colspan=9 style=| NCAA tournament

Awards and honors
Jerome Allen – Ivy League Player of the Year

Rankings

References

Penn Quakers men's basketball seasons
Penn
Penn
Penn
Penn